Shut Up & Listen is the fourth studio album by Dominican singer Henry Santos. Released by his own record label, HustleHard Entertainment on June 1, 2018. The title was inspired by an advice that Santos's received from his grandmother about abstaining from shouting during a couple's heated arguments. Santos said that this album is the most personal to him. He also mentioned that each song is like advise for couples. The album is like a manual for couples. This production features the singles "Descarados", "Tu Ego", and Algo Estúpido.

Track listing

References

2018 albums
Henry Santos albums
Spanish-language albums